Albert Samuel "Alby" Mathewson (born 13 December 1985) is a New Zealand rugby union player who plays as a scrum-half.

Early life and education
Mathewson was born in Hastings, New Zealand. He first attended Havelock North High School but switched to  Hastings Boys' High School to improve his game. He studied at Victoria University after finishing his schooling.

Rugby
Mathewson made his Wellington debut in 2006 and Hurricanes debut in 2007, before shifting to the Blues in 2010. Mathewson made his international debut for New Zealand in 2010.
In 2012, Mathewson signed a two-year contract with the Western Force in Australia, which he extended until 2016 two years later.

Mathewson joined Irish side Munster, who play in the United Rugby Championship and Champions Cup and have a history of playing New Zealand, on a four-month short-term contract in August 2018. Mathewson, who played against Munster for Toulon during the 2017–18 season and also played for New Zealand against Munster in November 2008, was signed as injury-cover for Ireland and British and Irish Lions international Conor Murray, who had been ruled out for a short period with a neck injury.

Mathewson made his debut for Munster on 29 September 2018, starting their 2018–19 Pro14 fixture against provincial rivals Ulster in Thomond Park, which Munster won 64–7. He scored his first try for Munster in the provinces 30–22 defeat at the hands of Leinster on 6 October 2018. He signed a three-month contract extension with Munster in November 2018. Mathewson's contract with Munster was again extended in February 2019, this time until the end of the 2018–19 season, before again being extended until the end of November 2019 to provide World Cup cover. His last appearance for Munster was in their 21–21 draw against French side Racing 92 in round two of the 2019–20 Champions Cup on 23 November 2019.

He joined Munster's provincial rivals Ulster on a one-year contract in July 2020, and made his debut for the province in their 26–20 defeat against Connacht on 23 August 2020. Mathewson was released by Ulster at the end of the 2020–21 season. He joined Australian Super Rugby side Queensland Reds on a short-term contract as injury cover for Tate McDermott in March 2022.

Personal life
Mathewson and his wife, Cara Mathewson, have two sons together. The oldest was born in Wellington, New Zealand, in 2010. At the time Mathewson was training with the All Blacks. Their youngest was born in Perth, Australia in 2015.

Super Rugby Statistics

References

External links
Munster Profile
Ulster Profile
Western Force Player Profile

Pro14 Profile

1985 births
Living people
People educated at Hastings Boys' High School
Rugby union players from Hastings, New Zealand
Rugby union scrum-halves
New Zealand rugby union players
New Zealand international rugby union players
Hurricanes (rugby union) players
Wellington rugby union players
Blues (Super Rugby) players
Western Force players
Auckland rugby union players
Hawke's Bay rugby union players
Canterbury rugby union players
Bristol Bears players
King Country rugby union players
RC Toulonnais players
Munster Rugby players
Ulster Rugby players
New Zealand expatriate rugby union players